Echinacea paradoxa, the yellow coneflower, Bush's purple coneflower, or Ozark coneflower, is a North American species of flowering plant in the family Asteraceae. It is native to southern Missouri, Arkansas, and south-central Oklahoma,  It is listed as threatened in Arkansas.

Description
Most of the leaves are basal leaves with smooth margins. They are alternate, becoming shorter higher up on the stem, and they are completely absent on the upper two-thirds of the stem.

One plant can produce several flower heads, each with white, pink, or yellow ray florets surrounding a central head of numerous disk florets. The central head is dome-shaped and dark reddish brown to nearly black. It is prickly to the touch. It blooms in May and June.

Taxonomy
Varieties
 Echinacea paradoxa var. paradoxa - yellow rays - Arkansas and Missouri - yellow coneflower or Ozark coneflower
 Echinacea paradoxa var.neglecta - pink or white rays Oklahoma and Texas - Bush's purple coneflower

Echinacea paradoxa var. paradoxa has a baseline chromosome number of x = 11, like most Echinacea plants.

Distribution and habitat
Echinacea paradoxa var. paradoxa, or yellow coneflower, is endemic to the Ozarks of Missouri and Arkansas. It is listed as imperiled in Arkansas.

Echinacea paradoxa var. neglecta, or Bush's purple coneflower, is currently only known to exist in the wild in the Arbuckle Mountains region of southeastern Oklahoma. One isolated population was reported from Montgomery County in eastern Texas. It is listed as critically imperiled in Oklahoma and presumed extirpated in Texas.

Habitats include partially sunny to sunny savannas, glades, limestone outcroppings, barrens, open hillsides, and bald knobs.

Gallery

References

Garden plants of North America
Plants described in 1902
paradoxa
Flora of the United States